Liana Badr (born 1950 in Jerusalem) is a Palestinian novelist, and short story writer.

Life
Badr is a novelist, story writer, journalist, poet and cinema director. She was raised in Jericho. She studied at the University of Jordan and graduated from the Beirut Arab University with a BA in philosophy and psychology. Badr studied at the Lebanese University. She earned her M.A. from Birzeit University. She lived in Beirut and worked as an editor for Al Hurriyya.

After 1982, she moved to Damascus, then Tunis, and Amman. She returned to Palestine in 1994.

She worked in the Palestinian Ministry of Culture (PMC) as a general director for the Arts. She worked in the Cinematic Archive through their Audiovisual department. She was editor of Dafater Thaqafiyya.

Works
 بوصلة من أجل عباد الشمس: رواية ؛ شرفة على الفاكهاني : قصص (Compass of the Sunflower) دار الثقافة الجديدة, 1989
 جحيم ذهبي: قصص (Hell of Gold: stories), دار الاداب،, 1991
نجوم أريحا (Jericho Stars), دار الهلال،,1993
 زنابق الضوء (Lilies light) 1998 دار شرقيات للنشر واالتوزيع,

Works in English
A compass for the sunflower, Women's Press, 1989, 

The Stars of Jericho, 1993 
The Eye of the Mirror, Translator Samira Kawar, Garner, 1994, ; Garnet, 2008,

Anthologies

Filmography
Fadwa: A Tale of  a Palestinian Poetess. 52 min, 1999.
Zeitounat. 37 min, 2000.
The Green Bird. 37 min, 2002.
Siege (A Writer's Diary). 33 min. 2003
The Gates are Open. Sometimes! 2006. 42 min.
A match on Thursday Afternoon. 2006. 3 min.
Al QUds – My City. 2010. 52 min

References

Sources

External links
"Interview with Liana Badr", Nisi Magazine, Moa Geistrand, 26 September 2010
"Liana Badr Eye of the Mirror", Art and Politics Now, January 31, 2010
"The Mothers of the Intifada in Liana Badr's Eye of the Mirror", The South Atlantic Quarterly, Volume 102, Number 4, Fall 2003, pp. 809–823

1950 births
Living people
Palestinian novelists
Palestinian women writers
People from Jerusalem
Palestinian short story writers
People from Amman
University of Jordan alumni
Palestinian women short story writers
Women novelists
20th-century Palestinian writers
20th-century Palestinian women
21st-century Palestinian writers
21st-century Palestinian women
21st-century Palestinian women writers
20th-century Palestinian women writers